Miss You In The Days is the third full-length studio album by British chamber pop band The Miserable Rich, released in 2011. It was the follow-up to 2010's Of Flight & Fury and was funded by fan-funding music website PledgeMusic. Miss You In The Days was later supplemented with the bonus EP Miss You More containing tracks which didn't make the album, released on 16 April 2012 separately via Bandcamp and with special editions of the album.

Miss You In The Days is lyrically based on ghost stories and was recorded on location at various buildings around the UK that are reputedly haunted, primarily Blickling Hall in Norfolk.

Track listing

Miss You More Bonus EP

References

2011 albums
The Miserable Rich albums